The following is a list of women who have won the Miss Grand International title.

Miss Grand International titleholders

Countries by number of wins

Continents by number of wins

Assumed wins 
Titles assumed following resignations.

Resigned wins

Gallery of winners

Runners-up and finalists

1st Runner-Up 
The first Runner-Up of each edition of Miss Grand International is the second placer behind the candidate who is crowned as Miss Grand International (first placer).

The current 1st runner-up is Engfa Waraha from Thailand, elected on 25 October 2022 in West Java, Indonesia.

Up position change

Resigned wins

2nd Runner-Up 
The second Runner-Up of each edition of Miss Grand International is the third placer behind the candidate who is crowned as Miss Grand International (first placer).

The current 2nd runner-up is Andina Julie from Indonesia, elected on 25 October 2022 in West Java, Indonesia.

3rd Runner-Up 
The third Runner-Up of each edition of Miss Grand International is the fourth placer behind the candidate who is crowned as Miss Grand International (first placer).

The current 3rd runner-up is Luiseth Materán from Venezuela, elected on 25 October 2022 in West Java, Indonesia.

4th Runner-Up 
The fourth Runner-Up of each edition of Miss Grand International is the fifth placer behind the candidate who is crowned as Miss Grand International (first placer).

The current 4th runner-up is Mariana Bečková from Czech Republic, elected on 25 October 2022 in West Java, Indonesia.

Notes

References

External links

Miss Grand International
Miss Grand International titleholders
Miss Grand International titleholders